Oplismenus thwaitesii is a flowering plant that is endemic to India.

Description
It has an obscure cross veins venation. It also has angular rachis which bottom is glabrous. They are also fertile, pedicelled, and sessile, with pedicels being oblong. They grow in a cluster of 2 and are subequal. Glumes are shorter than a spikelet and thinner than fertile lemma. The lower glume is ovate and have a pubescent surface. Its apex is acute and 1 awned. The upper glume is ovate as well but is herbaceous, 1-keeled and has veins of 5–7. Just like the lower glume, it is pubescent on the bottom but has an obtuse apex which can also be mucronate or muticous as well. Florets are 1-keeled and pubescent just like glumes but are 7-11 veined. The lower sterile floret of the lemma is ovate and is 1 length of a spikelet which is also emarginate, membranous and mucronate.

References

thwaitesii